Alan Galbraith may refer to:
 Alan Galbraith (politician)
 Alan Galbraith (record producer)